Typhoon Tokage, known in the Philippines as Typhoon Siony, was the deadliest typhoon to strike Japan since Typhoon Bess in 1982. The twenty-third storm to be named using an international list of names during the 2004 Pacific typhoon season, Tokage was the last of three typhoons to impact Japan from late-September to mid-October 2004. Typhoon Tokage began as a tropical depression near the Northern Mariana Islands on October 10. With very warm waters, the system started to undergo a rapid deepening phase early on October 13 and reached its peak strength on the 17th. Tokage made landfall over Japan on October 20, just before becoming extratropical.

Tokage was the 10th storm to strike Japan in 2004, making 2004 the largest year ever for the number of storms made landfall in Japan. The record until 2003 was 6 (1990 and 1993), but 2004 was 10.

Meteorological history

From Typhoon Meari and Ma-on, the Intertropical Convergence Zone became active since September 28. A large area of convection persisted on October 10. On October 12, the area of convection separated into two systems, with the other one becoming Typhoon Nock-ten, which existed 480 miles east-southeast of Guam within the ITCZ. The system developed into Tropical Depression 27W at late that day, moving in a west-northwesterly at 15 kn about 200 miles east of Guam.  On the October 13, the system developed into a tropical storm, and was named Tokage, subsequently moving very close to the islands of Rota and Guam. Typhoon intensity was achieved early on October 14 when centered 970 miles southeast of Okinawa.  Later that day, Tokage briefly turned to the west-southwest. The storm's path curved back to a northwesterly heading by the October 15. The storm curled towards the north as a major shortwave over weakened the subtropical ridge and by October 17 Tokage reached its peak intensity of 125 kn/145 mph.  Weakening began later that day as the storm turned back to a more northwesterly heading towards Okinawa and Japan.  On October 18, Typhoon Tokage was 290 miles south of Kadena Air Base, Okinawa. Recurvature back to the north-northeast towards Japan ensued while the typhoon slowly weakened. Tokage made its closest approach to Okinawa late on October 19 when it was passed just to the south-southeast. The storm turned to the northeast as continued to accelerate as its extratropical transition began. Tokage made landfall over Tosa-Shimizu, near the southern tip of Shikoku, Japan still at typhoon strength. By October 21, the cyclone weakened into a tropical storm 130 nm west of Tokyo, and later that day, the system completed the transition to a nontropical low.  The extratropical remains of Tokage moved rapidly northeastward, crossing the International Dateline around midday on October 23.

Impact and aftermath

Japan
Tokage came ashore over southern or southeastern Japan on 01:35 (UTC) of October 20. 

A total of 18,000 people were forced to evacuate their homes. Damages from the storm amounted to $2.3 billion (2004 USD). A total of 95 deaths were attributed to high winds, flooding and mudslides caused by Tokage, with an additional three people reported missing.

See also
Typhoon Mireille
Typhoon Meari (2004)
Tropical Storm Etau (2009)
Typhoon Wipha (2013)
Typhoon Neoguri (2014)
2018 Japan floods– a catastrophic flood event with similar impacts to Tokage

References

External links

JMA Best Track Data of Typhoon Tokage (0423) 
JMA Best Track Data (Graphics) of Typhoon Tokage (0423)
JMA Best Track Data (Text)
JTWC Best Track Data of Typhoon 27W (Tokage)
27W.TOKAGE from the U.S. Naval Research Laboratory

2004 Pacific typhoon season
Typhoons in Japan
Typhoons
2004 in Japan